The Church of Jesus Christ of Latter-day Saints in Bolivia refers to the Church of Jesus Christ of Latter-day Saints (LDS Church) and its members in Bolivia. The first small branch meeting was held in 1964 with 19 people in attendance. Since then, the LDS Church in Bolivia has grown to more than 200,000 members in 271 congregations. Bolivia ranks as having the 6th most members of the LDS Church in South America and 10th worldwide

History

Missions

Temples

See also

Religion in Bolivia

Notes

References

External links
 The Church of Jesus Christ of Latter-day Saints (Bolivia) - Official Site
 Bolivia at Newsroom (English)
 Newsroom - Bolivia (Spanish)